Arjola Dedaj (born 26 November 1981 in Tirana, Albania) is a blind Italian Paralympic athlete who competes in sprinting and long jump events in international level events.

Personal life 
Dedaj was born in Albania, she was discriminated by her visual impairment which she has had since the age of three years old because there were no schools in Albania that could provide her an education. She immigrated to Italy in a rubber dinghy in 1998 along with her father and brother to join her mother who was in Milan.

She and her partner Emanuele Di Marino, who is her training partner and also participates in Paralympic track and field events are referred to as "La coppia dei sogni" ("the dream couple" in Italian).

References

External links
 

1981 births
Living people
Sportspeople from Tirana
Athletes from Milan
Albanian emigrants to Italy
Paralympic athletes of Italy
Athletes (track and field) at the 2016 Summer Paralympics

Naturalised citizens of Italy
Medalists at the World Para Athletics European Championships